The Municipality of Šalovci is a municipality in the traditional region of Prekmurje in northeastern Slovenia. The seat of the municipality is the town of Šalovci. Šalovci became a municipality in 1994.

Settlements
In addition to the municipal seat of Šalovci, the municipality also includes the following settlements:
 Budinci
 Čepinci
 Dolenci
 Domanjševci
 Markovci

References

External links

Municipality of Šalovci on Geopedia
Municipality of Šalovci  website

Šalovci
1994 establishments in Slovenia